Uropterygius makatei is a moray eel found in surge-exposed inshore coral reefs around New Caledonia and Polynesia. It was first named by Gosline in 1958.

References

makatei
Fish described in 1958